Port Washington-Saukville School District (PWSSD) is a school district headquartered in Port Washington, Wisconsin. It serves that community and Saukville.

Prior to 2013 the school building served as polling sites. This was scrapped for security reasons.

Secondary schools:
 Port Washington High School
 Thomas Jefferson Middle School

Elementary schools:
 Dunwiddie Elementary School
 Lincoln Elementary School
  Eric Burke is the principal.
 Saukville Elementary School

References

External links
 Port Washington-Saukville School District
School districts in Wisconsin
Education in Ozaukee County, Wisconsin